Beit Sokolow (lit. Sokolov House) is the Tel Aviv home of the Israel Journalists Association.

History
Beit Sokolov is also used as a conference hall and a gallery for temporary art exhibitions. The building is located between the "Beit Hasofer" ("Writer's house") and the Tel Aviv offices of the Jewish Agency for Israel. It is named for Nahum Sokolow.

See also
Media of Israel

References

External links 
 Israeli Journalists Association website
Buildings and structures in Tel Aviv
Mass media in Israel
Hebrew-language newspapers